Chitra is a village in Sarath CD block in the Madhupur subdivision of the Deoghar district in the Indian state of Jharkhand.

Geography

Location

Overview
The map shows a large area, which is a plateau with low hills, except in the eastern portion where the Rajmahal hills intrude into this area and the Ramgarh hills are there. The south-western portion is just a rolling upland. The entire area is overwhelmingly rural with only small pockets of urbanisation.

Note: The full screen map is interesting. All places marked on the map are linked in the full screen map and one can easily move on to another page of his/her choice. Enlarge the full screen map to see what else is there – one gets railway connections, many more road connections and so on.

Area

Demographics
According to the 2011 Census of India, Chitra had a total population of 2,430, of which 1,252 (52%) were males and 1,172 (48%) were females. Population in the age range 0–6 years was 330. The total number of literate persons in Chitra was 2,100 (76.86% of the population over 6 years).

Civic administration

Police station
There is a police station at Chitra.

Chitra Coalfield
Chitra Coalfield is operated as a part of SP Mines Area of Eastern Coalfields.

Education
DAV Public School at Chitra was established in 1995. It secured affiliation of CBSE for class X in 1999 and a senior secondary school (plus two level) in 2003. It has been set up in association with ECL.

Chitra Inter College is a Hindi-medium coeducational institution established in 1993. It has facilities for teaching in class XI and class XII.

High School Chitra is a Hindi-medium coeducational institution established in 1974. It has facilities for teaching in class IX  and class X.

References

Villages in Deoghar district
Mining communities in Jharkhand